James L. Brulte (born April 13, 1956) is an American politician and former chairman of the California Republican Party, having served from March 3, 2013 to February 24, 2019. Brulte formerly served as a Republican in the California State Senate, representing the 31st district, from 1996 to 2004.  He also served as the Senate Republican leader from 2000 to 2004. Brulte also served as Vice-Chair of the Senate Budget and Fiscal Review Committee. He was previously the Republican Leader of the California State Assembly from 1992 to 1996. Brulte is the only freshman to ever serve as a party leader in both houses of the California State Legislature.

Early life and education
Brulte served in the California Air National Guard and was chosen as "Outstanding Airman of the Year" for the United States and its territories. He graduated from California State Polytechnic University, Pomona (Cal Poly Pomona). Brulte is married to the former Superintendent of Capistrano Unified School District, Kirsten Vital Brulte.

Political career

He was elected to the Assembly in 1990 to represent San Bernardino County's 65th District and was re-elected from the 63rd District in 1992 and 1994. In 1995 as the majority leader in the Assembly, Brulte was unable to prevent a democrat from being elected Speaker of the Assembly.

When term limits forced Brulte out of the Assembly, voters elected him to the State Senate in 1996 with 58% of the vote. He was re-elected in 2000 with 59% of the vote. Brulte retired from the Senate in 2004 due to term limits.

Brulte considered running for the State Board of Equalization in 2006; however, he decided not to run against Michelle Steel, the eventual victor.

Following the 2010 and 2012 election results in California, Brulte was widely encouraged to run for the chairmanship of the California Republican Party and was elected chairman on March 3, 2013. Coincidentally, Brulte was born in Glen Cove, New York as was his predecessor, Tom Del Beccaro.

Although out of office for almost 2 decades, in 2022 Brulte partnered with former California Insurance Commissioner Steve Poizner to bring the medical community and the legal community together to craft a legislative solution to end the decades long medical malpractice wars.  They compromise was enacted into law by the legislature and resulted in eliminating the need for an already qualified ballot initiative.
https://www.latimes.com/opinion/story/2022-06-07/california-lawmakers-ballot-measures-propositions

References

External links

Join California Jim Brulte

|-

|-

|-

  
|-

 
|-

|-

  

1956 births
21st-century American politicians
California National Guard personnel
California Republican Party chairs
California State Polytechnic University, Pomona alumni
Republican Party California state senators
Living people
Republican Party members of the California State Assembly
People from Ontario, California
Politicians from Glen Cove, New York
Republican National Committee members
20th-century American politicians